George Lorimer (26 February 1872 – 8 February 1897) was an English rugby union and professional rugby league footballer who played in the 1880s and 1890s. Prior to Tuesday 27 August 1895, Manningham was a rugby union club, it then became a rugby league club, and since Friday 29 May 1903 it has been the association football (soccer) club Bradford City.

Background 
George Lorimer was born in Manningham, Bradford, his birth was registered in Bradford district, West Riding of Yorkshire, England, he played for Manningham FC against Brighouse Rangers RFC with a heavy cold, he was subsequently diagnosed with acute neuralgia, he was appointed a nurse by Manningham F.C. and he was visited by the club's doctor; Mr Mercer, after some initial signs of recovery, he died aged 24 of typhoid fever in Bradford district, West Riding of Yorkshire, his funeral took place at Heaton Baptist Church, Heaton hundreds of people walked alongside the horse-drawn hearse, and an estimated 8,000 people lined the streets from Manningham to Heaton.

Playing career

Championship appearances 
George Lorimer played 39-matches in Manningham FC's victory in the Championship during the 1895–96 season.

Club career 
George Lorimer was the joint top points scorer, along with Cooper of Bradford FC, with 106-points during the 1895–96 season.

Change of Code 
Manningham converted from the rugby union code to the rugby league code on Tuesday 27 August 1895, consequently, he may have been both a rugby union and rugby league footballer for Manningham.

References

External links 
 Search for "Lorimer" at scrum.com (RU)
 George Edward Lorimer
 Search for "George Lorimer" at britishnewspaperarchive.co.uk

1872 births
1897 deaths
English rugby league players
English rugby union players
Manningham F.C. players
Rugby league fullbacks
Rugby league players from Bradford
Rugby union centres
Rugby union players from Bradford
Yorkshire rugby league team players